Guiding may refer to:

Guide, a person who leads travelers or tourists through unknown or unfamiliar locations
Girl Guiding and Girl Scouting, a Scouting movement
Girlguiding, the United Kingdom's largest girl-only youth organisation
Guiding County, a county in Guizhou Province, China

See also 
 Guidance (disambiguation)